Costante Degan (12 March 1930 – 1 July 1988) was an Italian politician.

Biography
Degan was born on 12 March 1930 in Mestre, Italy. He would get a degree in engineering before working as an engineer.

Degan joined the Christian Democracy after a long youth militancy in the Catholic Action. He was municipal councilor in Venice, then in Dolo, he also served as Mayor of Venice for a few days in 1988. He was a Deputy from 1963 to 1983 and a Senator from 1983 until his death in 1988.

Degan served several times as Undersecretary of State, subsequently he served as Minister of Health from 1983 to 1986 and as Minister of Merchant Navy from 1986 to 1987.

As Minister of Health Degan dealt with assisted fertilization and radioactivity. Having held this position during the Chernobyl disaster in 1986, he was the author of the prohibitions on the sale of milk and broad-leaf vegetables during the days of the radioactive emergency. He also presented the first smoking ban bill in 1968 to ban cigarette use in restaurants.

Degan died in 1988 at the age of 58 due to lung cancer in Mestre.

References

External links 

 Italian Parliament Page

1930 births
1988 deaths
Politicians from the Metropolitan City of Venice
Christian Democracy (Italy) politicians
Italian Ministers of Health
Deputies of Legislature IV of Italy
Deputies of Legislature V of Italy
Deputies of Legislature VI of Italy
Deputies of Legislature VII of Italy
Deputies of Legislature VIII of Italy
Senators of Legislature IX of Italy
Senators of Legislature X of Italy
Mayors of Venice